Animal Crackers is a 1930 American pre-Code Marx Brothers comedy film directed by Victor Heerman. The film stars the Marx Brothers, (Groucho, Harpo, Chico, and Zeppo), with Lillian Roth and Margaret Dumont. It was based on their Broadway musical of the same name, in which mayhem and zaniness ensue when a valuable painting goes missing during a party in honor of famed African explorer Captain Jeffrey T. Spaulding. A critical and commercial success upon its initial release, it was filmed at Paramount's  Astoria Studios in Astoria, Queens; it was the second of two films the Brothers would make in New York City.

It was adapted from the successful 1928 Broadway musical of the same title by George S. Kaufman and Morrie Ryskind, also starring the Marx Brothers and Margaret Dumont. The part of Hives the butler was played by Robert Greig who later appeared with the Marx Brothers again in Horse Feathers (1932).

Plot 
  
A newspaper headline explains that society matron Mrs. Rittenhouse is holding a lavish party at her home on Long Island. The party will host renowned explorer Captain Geoffrey (or Jeffrey) T. Spaulding, just returned from Africa, as the guest of honor. Also, as a special treat for the guests and Capt. Spaulding, revered art collector Roscoe W. Chandler will unveil his recently acquired painting, After The Hunt, by a famous fictional artist named Beaugard.

Hives instructs his six footmen on preparations for the party ("He's One of Those Men"). Chandler arrives with the Beaugard and proceeds to flirt with Mrs. Rittenhouse; her daughter Arabella appears and interrupts them. Capt. Spaulding's secretary, Horatio Jamison, announces the Captain's arrival ("I Represent The Captain") ("Hooray for Captain Spaulding, Part I"). Capt. Spaulding makes a grand entrance and announces that he cannot stay and must leave immediately ("Hello, I Must Be Going"). Mrs. Rittenhouse begs him to stay, and the guests declare their admiration for the Captain, and he decides to stay ("Hooray for Captain Spaulding, Part II"). Soon after, Signor Emanuel Ravelli, hired to provide music for the party, arrives followed a few moments later by his "partner"
the Professor, hired to provide music for the weekend event. After an elaborate introduction, The Professor scares the guests away with a pistol he grabs from Capt. Spaulding's gun rack. The Professor soon takes off chasing after an attractive blonde party-goer.

Arabella Rittenhouse is attending the party with her fiancé John Parker, who is a struggling painter. John feels discouraged because he hasn't been able to make a living with his art in order to support himself and Arabella. Arabella suggests John paint a portrait for Chandler, suggesting he would receive an impressive commission. John laughs at the idea, not believing Chandler to have a genuine appreciation for art. After examining the Beaugard, Arabella devises a scheme to win Chandler's interest in John's work: they'll replace the Beaugard with an almost perfect copy of it John painted in art school, since they can find no obvious differences. After the painting is unveiled at the party, they will surprise everyone and hopefully convince Chandler to hire John. Arabella asks Ravelli to switch the paintings. Meanwhile, another weekend party guest, Grace Carpenter thinks up the same idea with her friend Mrs. Whitehead, as a means of humiliating Mrs. Rittenhouse. They grab Grace's poorly made copy that she painted in art school and ask Hives to replace the Beaugard, unaware that they are removing John's copy.

Ravelli catches the Professor chasing after the blonde girl and scolds him. Soon, Mrs. Rittenhouse and Mrs. Whitehead arrive and after the Professor is finished brutally assaulting Mrs. Rittenhouse, the four proceed to play an absurd variation of Bridge. Ravelli and the Professor run into Chandler and recognize him as Abie the fish peddler from Czechoslovakia. Chandler tries to bribe the two in order to keep them quiet, but they end up taking his money, tie and garters as well as, miraculously, Chandler's birthmark which is transferred to the Professor's arm. After a series of strange interludes while speaking with Mrs. Rittenhouse and Mrs. Whitehead, Capt. Spaulding has a debate on art and the economy with Chandler after his encounter with Ravelli and the Professor.

Later that night a thunderstorm has put out the lights and Ravelli and the Professor attempt to replace the Beaugard. In the middle of the job, Capt. Spaulding and Mrs. Rittenhouse wander in. The Captain finds the Professor's lost fish in the sofa. Ravelli and the Professor succeed in replacing the painting.

During the party, Mrs. Rittenhouse invites Capt. Spaulding to speak about his travels in Africa. He proceeds to tell a ridiculous and absurd account of his travels before Mrs. Rittenhouse cuts him off. Signor Ravelli is invited to play some selection on the piano ("I'm Daffy Over You", "Silver Threads Among the Gold", "Gypsy Chorus"). After several quips and interruptions, Chandler invites the guests into the parlor, so he can unveil the Beaugard. Once the painting is revealed, Chandler notices the poor quality and realizes someone has stolen his painting and replaced it with a cheap imitation. John feels discouraged, thinking the painting is still his copy. Suddenly the lights go out again, and when restored, the imitation Beaugard is missing as well. The guests, now in an uproar, scatter and attempt to find the stolen painting, led by Capt. Spaulding. John and Arabella discuss the excitement of the situation and their love for each other ("Why Am I So Romantic?").

The next day, a police squad arrives to secure the house and search for the missing painting. Realizing that they may have gone too far, Mrs. Whitehead and Grace ask Hives for the Beaugard he took back, but he can't find it anywhere. Mrs. Whitehead deduces the Professor must have stolen it. After confronting him, she gets Grace's copy back. Later, John finds Grace's copy of the Beaugard and reveals to Arabella that someone else must have had the same idea to switch paintings. Realizing that Chandler never actually saw John's copy, they become more hopeful. Soon after, John realizes the copy he found is now missing. Captain Spaulding, Jamison, and Ravelli discuss how they might go about finding the missing painting. After getting the painting back from the Professor, who is now in disguise, John and Arabella bring it to Capt. Spaulding. They figure out that the Professor must be the one who stole the paintings, and enlist the police to help find him.

After a brief altercation, Spaulding, Ravelli, and Jamison enter with the Professor ("My Old Kentucky Home"). The Professor is apprehended, and the three paintings are returned. Chandler momentarily mistakes John's copy for the genuine Beaugard. Realizing his talent, Chandler hires John to do a series a portraits for him. After momentarily letting the Professor go free, the police sergeant tries to apprehend him. To escape arrest, the Professor sprays the guests with a knockout substance from a Flit can. After everyone is laid out on the floor and fully subdued, the film concludes with the Professor knocking himself out next to the pretty blonde he has been chasing throughout the entire film.

Cast
Groucho Marx as Captain Jeffrey Spaulding
Harpo Marx as The Professor
Chico Marx as Signor Emanuel Ravelli
Zeppo Marx as Horatio Jamison
Lillian Roth as Arabella Rittenhouse
Margaret Dumont as Mrs. Rittenhouse
Louis Sorin as Roscoe W. Chandler 
Hal Thompson as John Parker
Margaret Irving as Mrs. Whitehead
Kathryn Reece as Grace Carpenter
Robert Greig as Hives, the butler
Edward Metcalf as Inspector Hennessey
The Music Masters as Six Footmen

Jokes 
Four of Groucho's best-known quips:
"One morning I shot an elephant in my pajamas. How he got in my pajamas, I don't know."
(The American Film Institute listed this at number 53 in the 100 Greatest Movie Quotes of All Time.)
"Then, we tried to remove the tusks, ... but they were embedded in so firmly, we couldn't budge them.  Of course, in Alabama the Tusk-a-loosa. But that's entirely ir-elephant to what I was talking about."
"Africa is God's country – and He can have it."
"We took some pictures of the native girls, but they weren't developed. But we're going back again in a couple of weeks!"

Other quotes from Groucho:
"Ever since I met you, I've swept you off my feet."
"You mind if I don't smoke?"
"There's one thing I've always wanted to do before I quit: Retire."
"I was outside the cabin smoking some meat. There wasn't a cigar store in the neighborhood!"
"Didn't you ever see a Habeas Corpus?" Chico: "No, but I see Habeas Irish Rose."

The film also contains the well-known Chico–Harpo scene in which Chico keeps asking Harpo for "a flash" (meaning a flashlight), and Harpo – not understanding – produces from his bottomless trenchcoat and baggy pants a fish, a flask, a flute, a "flit", a "flush", etc.

Zeppo figures in a well-known scene in which Groucho dictates a letter to his lawyers in rambling pseudo-legalese. Zeppo gets to one-up Groucho: When asked to read the letter back, Zeppo informs him, "You said a lot of things I didn't think were very important, so I just omitted them!" whereupon a minor skirmish ensues: what he's omitted is the body of the letter. (Joe Adamson, in Groucho, Harpo, Chico, and Sometimes Zeppo, observed that this scene disproved the common notion that Zeppo was the least of the Marx Brothers:  "It takes a Marx Brother to pull something like that on a Marx Brother and get away with it.")

One more complex running joke has Groucho turning the dialogue into a scene out of the Eugene O'Neill play, Strange Interlude, in which the characters continually spoke asides that convey their thoughts. Groucho's voice becomes deep and droning as he steps apart from the other characters to comment on the sceneLiving with your folks. Living with your folks. The beginning of the end. Drab dead yesterdays shutting out beautiful tomorrows. Hideous, stumbling footsteps creaking along the misty corridors of time. And in those corridors I see figures, strange figures, weird figures: Steel 186, Anaconda 74, American Can 138 ...
The comedy, thus, is in the unpredictable shifting of the scene's meaning, from two socialite ladies and a world-famous explorer mingling at a party, to a parody of O'Neill's work, to a mimicking of a man reading out stock prices. Incidentally, Groucho had heavy investments in Anaconda Copper and after having lost everything in the stock market crash of 1929 experienced a bout of depression as well as insomnia.

In the final scene, Harpo uses a Flit gun to pacify an entire crowd, finally spraying Groucho, who falls unconscious to the ground. The current prints of the film have the "Flit" name blotted out, since Paramount Pictures didn't get permission to use the trademarked name.

Musical numbers
Groucho's songs, "Hello, I Must Be Going" and "Hooray for Captain Spaulding", both written by Bert Kalmar and Harry Ruby, became recurring themes for Groucho through the years. The latter song became the theme of Groucho's radio and TV game show You Bet Your Life. It referred to a real Captain Spaulding, an army officer arrested a few years earlier for selling cocaine to Hollywood residents. The original full version of "Hooray for Captain Spaulding" was edited in compliance to the Hays Code when it was re-released in 1936: the sexually suggestive line "I think I'll try and make her" was removed – it came after Mrs. Rittenhouse's line: "He was the only white man to cover every acre." It was long believed that this footage had been lost forever, until a pre-Hays Code print was discovered in the archives of the British Film Institute.  This forms the basis of Universal's Blu-ray restoration, released in October 2016.

Ironically, Groucho used an even more risqué line in introducing Chico's piano sequence: "Signor Ravelli's first selection will be, 'Somewhere My Love Lies Sleeping', with a male chorus." Chico's own piano composition "I'm Daffy over You" would be played again in their next feature film, Monkey Business, in the film's score and by Harpo on the harp.
He's One of Those Men (Hives and Footmen)
I Represent the Captain (Zeppo)
Hooray for Captain Spaulding Part I (The Cast)
Hello, I Must Be Going (Groucho)
Hooray for Captain Spaulding Part II (Cast)
Why Am I So Romantic? (Arabella and John, and as a harp interlude with Harpo)
I'm Daffy over You (Chico; the refrain is sometimes confused with the 1950s song "Sugar in the Morning")
Silver Threads Among the Gold (Chico)
Brief piano interlude (Harpo)
Gypsy-chorus (a.k.a. Anvil Chorus) (Chico)
My Old Kentucky Home (Marx Brothers)

Releases 

The original 1930 film release ran 99 minutes. In 1936, the film was reissued with several small cuts to accommodate the Production Code. This version ran about 98 minutes.

In December 1973, UCLA student and Marx Brothers fan Steve Stoliar drove to Anaheim, California, to view a rare screening of Animal Crackers at the Old Town Music Hall theater. The print shown there was old and of poor quality, probably because the film had not been distributed for theatrical release since the early 1950s. Paramount Pictures had allowed its licenses to expire, and rights had reverted to the authors of the Broadway stage play: the playwrights George S. Kaufman and Morrie Ryskind, the composer Harry Ruby, and the lyricist Bert Kalmar. Although MCA/Universal had acquired most of Paramount's pre-1950 sound feature film library in 1958, Animal Crackers evidently was regarded as a legal mess best left untouched. Stoliar impulsively contacted Groucho Marx to enlist Groucho's support for an unlikely campaign to attempt to persuade – or pressure – Universal to re-release the film. Groucho agreed to appear at the UCLA campus for a publicity event.

On February 7, 1974, Groucho and his assistant, Erin Fleming, visited UCLA under the aegis of Stoliar's newly formed "Committee for the Re-release of Animal Crackers" (CRAC). The event drew around 200 students, over 2,000 signatures on re-release petitions, and several reporters. Universal scrambled to appear responsive: a spokesman told a UCLA Daily Bruin reporter that the studio was "delighted" by the interest, and that "we have negotiated with the heirs of the writers (Morrie Ryskind and George S. Kaufman), but they were asking much more than we wanted to spend. Just recently we reached an agreement, and we're waiting to sign the contracts." (Not quite: Ryskind was still in the pre-heir stage – he lived until 1985. The songwriter Harry Ruby was also alive, though he died only two weeks later, aged 79.) The spokesman added that he expected the film would soon be released. As the Daily Bruin put it, "The rest of the day belonged to Groucho, as he showed surprising flashes of his old brilliance." Asked to name his favorite comedian, he said: "Me." He also said that "Animal Crackers is the best of our movies."

Groucho's UCLA appearance generated national press coverage. An appearance on the nationally syndicated Merv Griffin Show soon followed. In April 1974, Groucho and Stoliar "received an answer from Universal. According to Vice President Arnold Shane, they were 'delighted with the response of the students.'" On May 23, 1974, attempting to gauge public interest, Universal screened a sharp new print of the film at the UA Theater in Westwood, just south of the UCLA campus. Groucho made a personal appearance and walked unescorted into the theatre on the left aisle. People in the audience stood up and started applauding and soon the entire theater joined in. Encouraged by the response there – the lines stretched around the block for months – on June 23 the studio screened the film at the Sutton Theater in New York. Groucho attended the New York premiere. A near-riot broke out and a police escort was summoned. From there Animal Crackers went into national release.

Because of these rights issues, Animal Crackers had never been seen on television until July 21, 1979, when CBS broadcast a special showing of the film.

The complete, uncut Animal Crackers, which had only been available for decades in a version cut for the 1936 reissue, was restored from a 35mm duplicate negative held by the British Film Institute and released by Universal Pictures in 2016 in DCP format for theatrical distribution and Blu-ray for home video as part of The Marx Brothers Silver Screen Collection.  The restored edition features an optional commentary track by film historian Jeffrey Vance.

Reception
Like its predecessor The Cocoanuts, Animal Crackers was a financial success. By June 1932, the film had earned $1.5 million in worldwide theatrical rentals.

Multicolor clip

In the 1990s, a 15-second clip filmed in Multicolor during the rehearsal of a scene in Animal Crackers was found and aired as a part of the AMC documentary Glorious Technicolor (1998). The clip is significant because it is the earliest known color footage of the Marx Brothers, and also for an appearance by Harpo without his usual costume and wig.

References in popular culture
 "Hello, I Must Be Going" became a theme in Oliver Stone's miniseries Wild Palms. It was the title of the final episode, and sung by villain Senator Kreutzer (Robert Loggia) as he died.
 British musician Phil Collins titled his 1982 album after the song "Hello, I Must Be Going".
 The song "Hello, I Must Be Going" also accompanies the opening credits of Woody Allen's Whatever Works (2009).
 "Captain Spaulding" is one of many Marx Brothers character-related pseudonyms for Sid Haig's murderous clown character, John Cutter, in Rob Zombie's House of 1000 Corpses and its sequel The Devil's Rejects.
 The film is referenced in Murray Takes a Stand, a 1976 episode of The Mary Tyler Moore Show.
 In the TV series M*A*S*H  , in which actor Alan Alda's portrayal of Hawkeye Pierce is inspired by Groucho, early episodes featured  a character named Captain Calvin Spalding, played by musician Loudon Wainwright III.
 "Hooray For Captain Spaulding" is performed in English and in French in a scene toward the end of Woody Allen's 1997 movie musical Everyone Says I Love You at a party scene in Paris where all the guests are dressed as Groucho Marx.
 The Groucho-hosted quiz show You Bet Your Life used an instrumental version of "Hooray For Captain Spaulding" as the theme for most of its run.

See also
List of United States comedy films
Kalmar and Ruby songwriting team

References

External links

 
 
 
 Full description of Animal Crackers from Filmsite.org
 Internet Broadway Database entry on Animal Crackers
 
 Hooray for Captain Spaulding

1930 films
1930 comedy films
American black-and-white films
American comedy films
Films based on musicals
Films directed by Victor Heerman
Films set in country houses
Films set in Long Island
Films shot at Astoria Studios
Marx Brothers (film series)
Paramount Pictures films
1930s English-language films
1930s American films